The Wildhearts Must Be Destroyed is a 2003 album by The Wildhearts. The album's title makes reference to 1969 horror film Frankenstein Must Be Destroyed.

The album was the first new studio release since The Wildhearts broke up in 1997 and reformed in 2001. Rumours indicated that the album would feature the same line-up as the 1993 album Earth vs the Wildhearts, and that line-up did indeed reform in 2001, but bassist Danny McCormack dropped out and entered rehab just prior to the recording of the album. McCormack had appeared on some songs that would be used as B-sides for the album, but on the album itself bass duties were performed by group leader Ginger. Three singles were released in the UK with some chart success: "Vanilla Radio", "So into You" and "Top of the World". The B-sides from various versions of these singles later appeared on the compilations Riff After Riff After Motherfucking Riff and Coupled With.

Reception

Track listing 
All tracks written by Ginger unless noted otherwise.

Personnel 
 Ginger - vocals, guitar, bass
 C. J. - guitar, vocals
 Stidi - drums
 Justin Hawkins - backing vocals on "Only Love" and "Get Your Groove On"

References

The Wildhearts albums
2003 albums
Gut Records albums